The bishops are represented by the Conference of Catholic Bishops of Burundi (French: Conférence des évêques catholiques du Burundi, CECAB). 

The CECAB is a member of the Association des Conférences Episcopal de l'Afrique Centrale (ACEAC) and Symposium of Episcopal Conferences of Africa and Madagascar (SECAM). 

List of presidents of the Bishops' Conference

1980-1986: Joachim Ruhuna, Archbishop of Gitega

1986-1989: Evariste Ngoyagoye, bishop of Bubanza

1989-1997: Bernard Bududira, Bishop of Bururi

1997-2004: Simon Ntamwana, Archbishop of Gitega

2004-2007: Jean Ntagwarara, bishop of Bubanza

2007-2011: Evariste Ngoyagoye, Archbishop of Bujumbura

from 2011: Banshimiyubusa Gervais, Bishop of Ngozi

See also
Episcopal conference
Catholic Church in Burundi

References

Burundi
Catholic Church in Burundi